Employment is the relationship between the employee and the employer.

It may also mean:
 Employment (album), the Kaiser Chiefs album
 Employment (short story), the short story by L. Sprague de Camp

See also
Military personnel
Personnel (film)
Job (biblical figure)
Job (disambiguation)
Occupation (disambiguation)